The flag of Buryatia, officially the State Flag of the Republic of Buryatia, is one of the official symbols of the Republic of Buryatia, a federal subject of Russia.

Color scheme

History

Notes

See also
Coat of arms of the Republic of Buryatia
Anthem of the Republic of Buryatia

External links

Buryatia
Buryat Republic
Flags introduced in 1992
Buryatia